Marguerite Redman Dorgeloh (1890–1944) was an American printmaker. She took part in the Works Progress Administration's Federal Art Project.

Born on December 14, 1890, in Watsonville, California, Dorgeloh studied at the California School of Fine Arts and the State Teachers College at San Jose. She went on to work for the San Francisco Fine Arts Project of the Works Progress Administration (WPA).

Dorgeloh died by suicide on March 18, 1944, in Pasadena, California.

Collections
Smithsonian American Art Museum
Metropolitan Museum of Art
Smart Museum of Art, Chicago
Fine Arts Museums of San Francisco
National Gallery of Art, Washington
Newark Museum of Art
Philadelphia Museum of Art
Ackland Art Museum
Baltimore Museum of Art
University of Arizona Museum of Art

Gallery

References

External links
 

1890 births
1944 deaths
20th-century American women artists
20th-century American printmakers